The Pennsylvania Railroad's class K29s comprised a single experimental 4-6-2 "Pacific" type steam locomotive. Constructed by Alco-Schenectady, it was given road number 3395. Although only one demonstrator was constructed, the K29s would become the basis for the highly successful K4s Pacifics and L1s Mikados. The lone example spent most of its life on the PRR's Pittsburgh division main line and was retired around 1929.

History
The sole K29s, PRR 3395, was constructed by the American Locomotive Company's Schenectady works in 1911 as a demonstrator engine for the Pennsylvania Railroad. The success of the single experimental K29s lead to the development of the equally successful K4s class Pacific and L1s class Mikado locomotives. Despite its success, the K29s was one of only a handful of locomotives constructed by Alco Schenectady as the PRR preferred its own Altoona Works as well the Baldwin Locomotive Works in Philadelphia for large scale locomotive production. The sole K29s spent its entire operating life on the PRR's Pittsburg Division main line pulling limited passenger trains and being used as a helper engine. Rumors circulated stating the K29s was able to haul 13 full sized passenger cars unassisted on an uphill grade between Gallitzin, Pennsylvania and Altoona, Pennsylvania. By 1929 however, the K29s was stricken from the PRR's locomotive roster.

Specifications
The K29s used the Walschaerts valve gear, with  cylinders. It was paired with a Class 80-P-83 tender that could carry  of water and 14 tons of soft coal. Most of the basic specifications can also be found on the succeeding K4s Pacifics, which was directly developed from the K29s.

References

Further reading
 

K29s
Experimental locomotives
4-6-2 locomotives
Steam locomotives of the United States
Scrapped locomotives
Standard gauge locomotives of the United States